Felix Mandl (born 5 June 2003) is an Austrian footballer who plays as a forward for FC Dornbirn.

Club career
In the summer of 2021, he signed a three-year contract with FC Juniors OÖ. On 6 February 2022, Mandl returned to Wacker Innsbruck on loan with an option to buy.

Career statistics

Club

Notes

References

2003 births
Living people
Austrian footballers
Austria youth international footballers
Association football forwards
FC Wacker Innsbruck (2002) players
FC Juniors OÖ players
FC Dornbirn 1913 players
2. Liga (Austria) players